Age of Panic is a 2013 French dramedy film written and directed by Justine Triet.

Much of the film was shot on the streets of Paris during the 6 May 2012 national elections.

Plot
On 6 May 2012, the day of the second round of the French presidential election, TV journalist Laetitia (Dosch) is late leaving home for her assignment covering the events on Rue de Solférino (at the headquarters of the Socialist Party) when her ex, Vincent (Macaigne), shows up a day late to his court-appointed time to visit their two daughters.

Cast
Lætitia Dosch as Laetitia
Vincent Macaigne as Vincent
Arthur Harari as Arthur
Virgil Vernier as Virgil
Marc-Antoine Vaugeois as Marc
Jeane Ara-Bellanger as Jeane
Liv Harari as Liv
Emilie Brisavoine as Emilie
Vatsana Sedone as Vatsana, the neighbor
Colin Ledoux as man of the couple on the bridge
Chloé Lagrenade as woman of the couple on the bridge
Maxime Schneider as the driver
Guilhem Amesland as the militant fighter
Aurélien Bellanger as the militant UMP
Zine-Zine Sidi Omar as the investigator (as Sidi Omar Zine Zine)

Title
The original title is La Bataille de Solférino, referring to the Battle of Solferino (an 1859 battle during the Second Italian War of Independence) and the Rue de Solférino, a street in the Left Bank area of Paris, where the headquarters of the French Socialist Party (PS) are located.

Soundtrack
The closing credits features the song "Lose Your Soul" by Dead Man's Bones.

Release
Age of Panic had its premiere in Cannes' .

Age of Panic had theatrical showings in North America as part of the Rendez-vous with French Cinema series 2014 program (first screening on 7 March).

Critical response
Review aggregation website Rotten Tomatoes reported an approval rating of 100%, based on 5 reviews, with an average score of 7.1/10.

Jordan Mintzer of The Hollywood Reporter said of it: "With several scenes filmed on location during the actual Election Day events, Age of Panic mixes documentary-style drama with scenes of Mumblecore-esque comedy in ways that are often compelling and occasionally quite funny. Triet definitely has a knack for creating uncomfortable situations that go from bad to awful, only to suddenly lighten up in the interim, and although she can't quite sustain things for feature length, the film's smart setup and ambitious shooting tactics make for a highly watchable affair."

Ronnie Scheib of Variety commented that "Triet brilliantly orchestrates the intersection of documentary and fiction. [...] [T]he spontaneous ebb and flow of the enormous French crowds seen here synchs visually and rhythmically with the film's domestic Sturm und Drang, acted throughout with improvisatory immediacy. Although  Laetitia acts out the precarious pressures of the harassed career mom with considerable brio, it is Macaigne's Vincent, almost psychotically internalizing the panic of his thirtysomething generation, that lingers in the mind; indeed, the downbeat, dirty-haired Macaigne seems to be emerging as French indie cinema's newest neurotic loser par excellence."

Kent Turner of Film-Forward said that "[n]o caffeine is necessary before watching Justine Triet's The Age of Panic, with its anxiety-producing first hour [...] There's not a chance that anyone will nod off. The film singly breaks the festival out of any art-house stupor.

The IFC Center called it an "enormously promising first feature, a very funny comedy of discomfort infused with documentary-style energy [...] all within the frame of one manic day in Paris."

In Cahiers du Cinéma's top ten of 2013, it occupies the tenth place.

Accolades
The Age of Panic won the audience prize at the Paris Cinema International Film Festival in July 2013.

It was nominated for the Best First Feature Film at the 2014 César Awards.

References

External links

La Bataille de Solférino at Allocine
 (without English subtitles)

2013 films
2013 comedy-drama films
French comedy-drama films
2010s French-language films
Films directed by Justine Triet
Films set in Paris
Films set in 2012
Films shot in Paris
2012 French presidential election
2010s French films